The 2022–23 New Mexico State Aggies men's basketball team represented New Mexico State University in the 2022–23 NCAA Division I men's basketball season. The Aggies, were led by first-year head coach Greg Heiar, and played their home games at the Pan American Center in Las Cruces, New Mexico, as members of the Western Athletic Conference.

On November 19, 2022, reports of a shooting involving a student from the University of New Mexico and an Aggie basketball player ended with the student dead, with the player, later identified as Mike Peake, wounded on the UNM Main Campus in Albuquerque. On November 20, New Mexico State Police release details of the shooting, including the arrest of 17-year old Mya Hill. The next day, the New Mexico State Police confirmed a second arrest relating to the shooting, arresting 19-year old Jonathan Smith.

The Aggies and Lobos were slated to renew the Rio Grande Rivalry on the night of the shooting, but the game was postponed. Three days later, both schools decided to cancel the Rio Grande Rivalry for the season due to safety concerns. On December 5, NM State Athletic Director Mario Moccia announced the indefinite suspension of the 21-year old Mike Peake. No charges have been filed against Peake in what was called a "self-defense situation", but there are two investigations surrounding the shooting.

On February 10, 2023, New Mexico State announced it would suspend operations of the men's basketball team based on new allegations including potential violations of university policy. Its entire coaching staff was placed on administrative leave as a result. KTSM reported that the season was suspended because of allegations of hazing by at least three different players multiple times.

The rest of the team's games were cancelled and later deemed forfeits by the WAC on February 13. They will not take part in the 2023 WAC Tournament.

The NCAA does not recognize the forfeited games as part of the team's overall record.

On February 14, head coach Greg Heiar was officially fired by NMSU.

Previous season
The Aggies finished the 2021–22 season 27–7, 14–4 in WAC play to finish in a three-way tie for the regular season championship, alongside Seattle and Stephen F. Austin. They defeated Grand Canyon and Abilene Christian to win the WAC tournament title and earned the conference's automatic bid to the NCAA tournament. They received the No. 12 seed in the West Region, where they upset No. 5 seed UConn in the First Round, before losing to No. 4 seed Arkansas in the Second Round.

Roster

Schedule and results

|-
!colspan=12 style=| Exhibition

|-
!colspan=12 style=| Non-conference regular season

|-
!colspan=12 style=| WAC regular season

Sources

References

New Mexico State Aggies men's basketball seasons
New Mexico State
New Mexico State Aggies men's basketball
New Mexico State Aggies men's basketball